Luis Matias (born 29 September 1986 in Luanda) is an Angolan swimmer, who represented Angola at the 2004 Summer Olympics in the Men's 100 metre butterfly. While he won heat 1 with a time of 58.92, he finished in 58th place out of 60 spots and did not advance.

References

External links
 

1986 births
Living people
Sportspeople from Luanda
Angolan male swimmers
Olympic swimmers of Angola
Swimmers at the 2004 Summer Olympics
Swimmers at the 2008 Summer Olympics
Male butterfly swimmers